Tommy Ryan (born 1930) is an Australian former rugby league footballer. A prolific try scorer, Ryan became a dual premiership winning player with the  St. George Dragons  and also represented Australia.

Career

Originally from Inverell, New South Wales, Ryan began his first grade career with St. George Dragons in 1951. By 1953, he represented New South Wales against the American 'All Stars' and was also picked for the Kangaroo tour.  Tommy Ryan scored 24 tries in 20 matches whilst on tour with the 1952/53 Kangaroos and played in four test matches.

He is listed on the Australian Players Register as Kangaroo No. 299.

Tommy Ryan made his first Grand Final appearance for the Dragons in 1953. In 1954 he played one year in Temora before moving to Rockhampton Queensland in 1955 and represented the state before returning to the Dragons for the finals in 1955.

He later played in the 1956 and 1957 St. George Grand Final victories and was the NSWRFL competition's leading try scorer in 1956 (19 tries) and 1957 (26 tries, in just 19 matches); the latter standing as a St. George Dragons club record that stood until 2001.

Tommy Ryan celebrated his 90th birthday on 9 May 2020.

References

External links
Tommy Ryan at nrlstats.com
Tommy Ryan at rugbyleagueproject.com
Dragons players at showroom.com.au

1930 births
Australian rugby league players
St. George Dragons players
Australia national rugby league team players
New South Wales rugby league team players
Queensland rugby league team players
City New South Wales rugby league team players
Living people
Rugby league wingers
Date of birth missing (living people)